Ancylomenes holthuisi is a species of marine shrimp in the family Palaemonidae. It was first described in 1969 by A.J. Bruce as Periclimenes holthuisi.

It is widespread throughout the tropical waters of the Indo-West Pacific. It is a cleaner shrimp and usually lives in association with sea anemones, scleractinian corals or jellyfish.

References

External links
 

Palaemonoidea
Marine fauna of Asia
Marine fauna of Oceania
Marine fauna of Southeast Asia
Crustaceans described in 1969